USS Warbler (AMS/MSC-206) was a  of the United States Navy, that saw service during the Vietnam War, and was later sold to Fiji, where she served as HMFS Kiro (MSC-206).

Construction
Warbler was laid down on 15 October 1953, Bellingham Shipyards, Bellingham, Washington; and was launched on 18 June 1954, as AMS-206; sponsored by Mrs. S. A. Blythe; reclassified as MSC-206 on 7 February 1955; and commissioned at the Naval Station, Tacoma, Washington, on 26 July 1955.

West Coast operations 
Following shakedown training, Warbler reported to Commander, Mine Force, Pacific Fleet, and operated locally out of Long Beach for the next year.

Western Pacific service 
Homeporting at Sasebo, Japan, Warbler would remain in the Far East over the next 14 years, participating in numerous mine exercises with the navies of other friendly Far Eastern nations such as South Korea, the Republic of China, the Philippines, and Japan.

Vietnam War service
Highlighting the ship's deployment to the western Pacific, Warbler conducted numerous tours of duty on "Operation Market Time" patrols off the coast of Vietnam to aid in the interdiction campaign to cut off the flow of arms and munitions to the Viet Cong in South Vietnam. A small wooden craft especially designed for coastal minesweeping operations and deployments lasting from a few days to several weeks, Warbler and her sister minesweepers filled the gap between the heavier units of the fleet, like the destroyers and destroyer escorts, and the small craft used for patrol work, until built-for-the-purpose patrol craft could enter the fray. During her "Market Time" cruises, Warbler boarded many junks, ascertaining cargo and destination; investigated contacts of steel-hulled vessels picked up on radar; and endured what at times appeared to be "fearfully strong weather that seemed bent on total destruction" of the ship. At times, boarding of junks was an impossibility because of the vagaries of monsoon-type weather.

During one "Market Time" patrol in the spring of 1968, Warbler conducted a joint salvage evolution with the salvage vessel . She located a downed F-100 Super Sabre fighter, and a wayward box of hypodermic needles. The ship also conducted extensive searches for an A-6 Intruder, a medevac helicopter, and two target drones. The minesweeper then cruised off the Vietnamese Demilitarized Zone (DMZ) before heading home to Sasebo, via the Nationalist Chinese port of Kaohsiung.

With 45 days of "Market Time" patrols under her belt in 1968, Warbler returned to the coast of Vietnam in January 1969, and patrolled briefly near the port of Vung Tau. Later that autumn, Warbler, in company with her sister-ship Whippoorwill, departed Sasebo on 5 September, bound for Taiwan and Mine Exercise Canned Heat. Unfortunately beset with mechanical difficulties, the ship went dead in the water in the Formosa Strait after attempted repairs at Keelung, Taiwan, had proved ineffective. Eight hours after the ship stopped,  answered Warblers call for assistance and passed a tow to the heavily rolling minecraft. By 10 September, after rapid repairs at Kaohsiung, Warbler was ready for sea and participated in the scheduled slate of exercises. At the close of the year, the ship received counter-insurgency practice by tracking high speed patrol boats sent out for exercise purposes by Commander, Mine Flotilla 1.

For two months in 1970, Warbler patrolled between Camranh Bay and Nha Trang, investigating suspicious contacts — none of which proved hostile. "Our greatest excitement during this patrol," her commanding officer later wrote, "was provided by an occasional Soviet merchantman that would steam through our area and find himself shadowed and photographed by the mighty Warbler."

Decommissioning – Reserve ship
Whippoorwill consequently relieved Warbler of "Market Time" duties on 19 July 1970, and the latter got underway from Camranh Bay for the succession of port visits. However, two days after leaving the bay, the ship received a message directing her to return to the United States for decommissioning. On 1 October 1970, Warbler was decommissioned.

Simultaneously placed in service as a Naval Reserve training (NRT) ship and homeported at Seattle, Washington, Warbler commenced her new duties soon thereafter. She trained reservists out of Seattle into the mid-1970s and was placed on the sale list in July 1975.

Transfer to the Fijian Navy
On 14 October 1975, she was sold to Fiji, to serve as HMFS Kiro (MSC-206). On 10 October 1995, she was decommissioned.

Disposal
In September 1996, the decommissioned Kiro was to be disposed by sinking. The mast broke off and fell into the sea just as she was exiting the Suva Harbour channel, and later the towing pad eye was ripped off the deck, due its rotten state. Kiro drifted onto a reef at  where she broke in two. The wreck was later doused with fuel and set on fire. She burned continuously for 19 hours leaving only the engines and the very lower part of the hull.

Awards
Warbler was awarded seven engagement stars for her important services on "Market Time" patrols.

Notes

Bibliography 

Online resources

External links 

 www.usswarbler.org

 

Bluebird-class minesweepers
Ships built in Bellingham, Washington
1954 ships
Cold War minesweepers of the United States
Vietnam War minesweepers of the United States
Ships transferred from the United States Navy to the Fijian Navy
Minesweepers of the Fijian Navy
Maritime incidents in 1996
Adjutant-class minesweepers